Frank Hoar (21 September 1896 – 27 May 1972) was a New Zealand cricketer. He played in two first-class matches for Wellington in 1928/29.

See also
 List of Wellington representative cricketers

References

External links
 

1896 births
1972 deaths
New Zealand cricketers
Wellington cricketers
Cricketers from Wellington City